Stefano Langone (born February 27, 1989), known as Stefano in his recording career, is an American singer and musician from Kent, Washington. Langone placed seventh on the tenth season of American Idol. Post American Idol, Stefano Langone continued to pursue his musical career, turning professional immediately after his appearance on the show. Langone became an independent artist in January 2014, performing from a wide diverse range of musical genres including pop, classical, rap, jazz and soul.

Personal life
Langone was born on February 27, 1989, in Bellevue, Washington, to Ernie and Carrie Langone. His father is Italian and his mother is Mexican. His father works as a career advisor at The Art Institute of Seattle and is also a singer and musician. Langone has been singing and playing the piano since childhood. He attended Emerald Park Elementary School, Meridian Junior High, and Kentwood High School, as well as Bellevue College, where he was given a full ride scholarship. He performed with Bellevue College's 'Celebration!' vocal jazz ensemble while he was a student there.

On May 28, 2009, he was involved in a near-fatal accident after being hit by a drunk driver. The accident resulted in two broken arms, a fractured pelvis, and other serious injuries. In addition, Langone had to learn to walk again and has extensive scarring as a result of the accident.

On May 16, 2010, Langone was arrested on suspicion of DUI a year after the accident. He was later only charged with a lesser crime of first-degree negligent driving for which he pleaded guilty to negligent driving.

He married Chelsea Corp in Los Angeles on July 27, 2019.

Career 
Following Stefano's accident he turned to music to aid his recovery. With the help of his father, Stefano began uploading covers and original music to  his YouTube account as early as May 29, 2010. His original upload garnered over 100,000 views, encouraging Langone to pursue a wider audience. On February 9, 2011, Langone auditioned for the tenth season of American Idol in San Francisco California performing Marvin Gaye's "I Heard It Through the Grapevine".

American Idol
Langone auditioned for the tenth season of American Idol in San Francisco, California. He advanced to the Top 13 through a wild card selection by Jennifer Lopez. Langone was eliminated from the show on April 21, 2011, finishing in seventh place.

Performances/results

 When Ryan Seacrest announced the results for this particular night, Langone was among the Bottom 3, but declared safe second as Casey Abrams received the fewest votes and was saved by the judges.
 Due to the judges using their one save on Casey Abrams, the Top 11 remained intact for another week.
 When Ryan Seacrest announced the results for this particular night, Langone was among the Bottom 3, but declared safe second as Pia Toscano was eliminated.
 When Ryan Seacrest announced the results for this particular night, Langone was among the Bottom 3, but declared safe second as Paul McDonald was eliminated.

Post-Idol
Following his elimination, Langone appeared on several talk shows. He appeared on Live with Regis and Kelly on April 25, 2011, as well as The Today Show on April 26, 2011. In addition, Langone appeared on The Rachael Ray Show along with Paul McDonald and Pia Toscano on May 25, 2011. 
The following summer, Langone toured with the American Idols LIVE! Tour 2011, which began in West Valley City, Utah, on July 6, 2011, and ended in Manila, Philippines, on September 21, 2011.

On September 24, 2011, Langone sang the National Anthem at the Western Hockey League game opener between the Seattle Thunderbirds and Portland Winterhawks. On September 26, 2011, Langone and James Durbin appeared on Dr. Drew's "Lifechangers" TV Talk show.

Record deal, debut album (2011–2015)
Langone is currently being co-managed by 19 Entertainment and Red Light Management. In January 2012, Langone announced that he has signed a record contract with Hollywood Records. 
While recording his debut album, Langone has performed at several events. On October 15, 2011, Langone performed at Eva Longoria’s Charity Padres El Cáncer in Las Vegas. On November 24, 2011, Langone performed at the Philadelphia Thanksgiving Day Parade. Langone took part in the Hollywood Christmas Parade on November 27, 2011. On December 4, 2011, Langone performed at Trevor Live, an event benefiting The Trevor Project. Langone performed the National Anthem at a San Francisco 49ers and Pittsburgh Steelers December 2011 game. On February 8, 2012, Langone performed in a Motown music tribute at Carnegie Hall.

On April 26, 2012, Langone returned to American Idol to perform his debut single, "I'm on a Roll". "I'm on a Roll" was released on iTunes on April 24. The track sold around 20,000 in its first week. 
On July 16, Langone performed "I'm on a Roll" on Good Morning America.

Langone is currently being co-managed by 19 Entertainment and Red Light Management. In January 2012, Langone announced that he has signed a record contract with Hollywood Records. While recording his debut album, Langone has performed at several events. On October 15, 2011, Langone performed at Eva Longoria’s Charity Padres El Cáncer in Las Vegas. On November 24, 2011, Langone performed at the Philadelphia Thanksgiving Day Parade. Langone took part in the Hollywood Christmas Parade on November 27, 2011. On December 4, 2011, Langone performed at Trevor Live, an event benefiting The Trevor Project. Langone performed the National Anthem at a San Francisco 49ers and Pittsburgh Steelers December 2011 game. On February 8, 2012, Langone performed in a Motown music tribute at Carnegie Hall.

On April 26, 2012, Langone returned to American Idol to perform his debut single, "I'm on a Roll". "I'm on a Roll" was released on iTunes on April 24. The track sold around 20,000 in its first week. On July 16, Langone performed "I'm on a Roll" on Good Morning America.

Langone's second single "Yes to Love" was released on February 12, 2013. Langone performed "Yes to Love" on American Idol on April 25, 2013.

Langone released a single "Lemon Squeeze", produced by a new label SpeakerMind Productions, on October 17, 2014. He released another single, "Fill My Cup", on February 17, 2015. This single was supposed to be followed by Langone's debut, Obsession, later that year. Obsession was ultimately released a year later as a five-track EP.

As an independent artist (2015-present) 
Following the end of his recording contract, Langone began to perform covers for popular songs including Adele's, "All I Ask" On February 29, 2016, and Tevin Campbell's, "Can We Talk" on March 25, 2018. Following the release of these covers, Langone began to collaborate with Scott Bradlee's postmodern Jukebox to perform a number of covers, these included briefly reuniting with his former American Idol compatriot Pia Toscano to perform a duet of Andrea Bocelli's "The Prayer" (Celine Dion and Andrea Bocelli song) on August 3, 2017, he also covered Ed Sheeran's, "the Shape of you" on June 21, 2018, followed up a year later with The Jonas Brothers, "Sucker" on June 21, 2019.

In 2018, Langone performed with Kenny "Babyface" Edmonds at the Kennedy Center as a feature on his tour.
Stefano Langone has begun releasing original singles starting with "call it love" on, June 18, 2019, he followed up this release with "invincible" on, May 14, 2020, and "Next Year" on October 20, 2020 he concluded these releases with "Why I am here" on December 19, 2020

In December 2021 Stefano Langone announced he suffered from a vocal polyp which restricted the use of his vocal chords and left him on vocal rest for 2 months, prior to surgery which occurred earlier the next year. Langone began to Rehab to repair his vocal chords with speech pathologist Amy Chapman. Langone announced that was able to begin singing again in spring 2021, when he performed the national anthem at the Stables Center for an NHL match on April 26, 2021, between the Los Angeles Kings and Anaheim Ducks.

Stefano Langone will be touring as part of Kenny "Babyface" Edmonds's Full Circle Tour which begins in April 2022.

Discography

Singles

EPs

References

External links
Official Site
Stefano Langone on American Idol

1989 births
Living people
American Idol participants
21st-century American singers
American people of Italian descent
American musicians of Mexican descent
Singers from Washington (state)
People from Bellevue, Washington
People from Kent, Washington
American male pop singers
Kentwood High School (Washington) alumni
21st-century American male singers